Ceratomyxa elegans is a species of myxozoans. It is found in the Mediterranean and the Argentinian Seas. It is a parasite of Batrachoidiform toadfishes.

References

External links 

 
 Ceratomyxa elegans at World Register of Marine Species (WoRMS)

Ceratomyxidae
Animals described in 1929
Fauna of Argentina
Invertebrates of Europe